Pseudomonas mendocina is a Gram-negative environmental bacterium that can cause opportunistic infections, such as infective endocarditis and spondylodiscitis, although cases are very rare. It has potential use in bioremediation as it is able to degrade toluene. Based on 16S rRNA analysis, P. mendocina has been placed in the P. aeruginosa group.

References

External links
Type strain of Pseudomonas mendocina at BacDive -  the Bacterial Diversity Metadatabase

{{/*Complete Genome of Pseudomonas mendocina NK-01, Which Synthesizes
Medium-Chain-Length Polyhydroxyalkanoates and
Alginate Oligosaccharides*/}}

Pseudomonadales
Bacteria described in 1970